Tons of Money is a farce by the British writers Will Evans and Arthur Valentine.  It was co-produced by Tom Walls and Leslie Henson. In the story of the play, a hard-up inventor pretends to be his cousin, in order to escape the clutches of his creditors.

First production

The play was produced by Tom Walls and Leslie Henson.  It was first given at the Shaftesbury Theatre, London, on 13 April 1922, directed by E. Holman Clark.

Original cast
Sprules, butler – George Barrett
Simpson, parlourmaid – Ena Mason
Benita Mullett – Mary Brough
Louise Allington – Yvonne Arnaud
Aubrey Henry Maitland Allington – Ralph Lynn
Giles, gardener – Willie Warde
James Chesterman, solicitor – J. Robertson Hare
Jean Everard – Madge Saunders
Henry – Tom Walls
George Maitland – Sidney Lynn
Source: Who's Who in the Theatre.

It ran for 737 performances, at the Shaftesbury and the Aldwych. It was at the time only the fourth non-musical show to surpass 700 performances in a West End run.

Plot
Aubrey Allington is a hopelessly impractical inventor who is deep in debt. When he inherits a large sum from a relation in Mexico he stands to see none of it because his creditors would claim it all. His resourceful wife comes up with a solution: the cousin to whom the legacy reverts on Aubrey's death is believed to be dead. Aubrey's supposed death in an explosion in his laboratory enables him to come to life again masquerading as the cousin from Mexico, able to collect the full legacy. He reappears in sombrero and extravagantly Mexican guise. Unfortunately for the conspirators, the cousin's long-estranged wife claims Aubrey as her own, and a further fake suicide – this time by drowning – ensues so that Aubrey can escape her. Meanwhile Sprules, the family butler, has got wind of the plot, and seeks to cash in by arranging for his brother to impersonate the Mexican cousin. The impostor's arrival necessitates a further reincarnation of Aubrey, this time as the new curate of a nearby parish. He tries to come to an agreement with the pretended Mexican, but they are interrupted by the arrival of the very-much-alive real cousin. In the end it turns out that there is no legacy to be had: the money has been annexed by the Mexican Revolutionary Committee.

Revivals and adaptations
Alan Ayckbourn updated and directed the play in 1986 in a revival by the National Theatre starring Polly Adams and Simon Cadell, with Michael Gambon as Sprules.

The play was adapted for the cinema on two occasions. A 1924 silent film Tons of Money was directed by Frank Hall Crane and starred Leslie Henson. A 1930 sound version Tons of Money directed by Tom Walls starred many of the Aldwych regulars. The BBC has broadcast two adaptations of the play for television. In 1947 Winifred Shotter and Desmond Walter-Ellis starred as the Allingtons. Eleanor Summerfield and Frankie Howerd were the leads in a 1954 television version.

Tons of Money was adapted into a musical in Australia in 1924 by Vaiben Louis and Willy Redstone and the producer Hugh J. Ward.

Notes, references and sources

Notes

References

Sources
 
 

1922 plays
Comedy plays
British plays adapted into films